KNUZ (106.1 FM) is a radio station broadcasting a country music format. Licensed to San Saba, Texas, United States, the station is currently owned by Roy E. Henderson, through licensee S Content Marketing, LLC.

References

External links
KNUZ's official website

Country radio stations in the United States
NUZ
Radio stations established in 1997